Jabal Bahri is a sub-district located in Al Udayn District, Ibb Governorate, Yemen. Jabal Bahri had a population of 6062 as of 2004.

References 

Sub-districts in Al Udayn District